Arkansas is the 48th richest state in the United States of America, with a per capita income of $16,904 (2000).

Arkansas Counties Ranked by Per Capita Income

Note: Data is from the 2010 United States Census Data and the 2006-2010 American Community Survey 5-Year Estimates.

References

Arkansas
Economy of Arkansas
Income